Cymolomia hartigiana is a moth of the family Tortricidae. It is found from northern and central Europe to eastern Russia, China, Korea and Japan.

The wingspan is 14–18 mm. Adults are on wing from May to August. There is one generation per year.

The larvae feed on Abies alba and Picea excelsa.

External links
Eurasian Tortricidae

Tortricinae
Moths of Japan
Moths of Europe